Frank Sears Platts (July 27, 1888 - July 7, 1972) was an American Republican Party politician who served seven terms in the New Jersey General Assembly.

Early life
Platts was born July 27, 1888 in Newark, New Jersey, the son of Frank James Platts (1857-1932) and Mary Josephine "Josie" Sears (1862-1895).  He graduated New York University and New Jersey Law School.  He was a Certified Public Accountant.  Platts was a World War I veteran and served as Assistant Division Adjutant of the Port of Hoboken.

Political career
He was elected to the New Jersey State Assembly in 1932 and re-elected in 1933.  He was Chairman of the Assembly Appropriations Committee in 1933.  He was again elected Assemblyman in 1937, and was re-elected in 1938, 1939, and 1940.

Platts was elected Essex County Freeholder in 1950.

Family
He married Bertha "Bertie" Agnes Eschenfelder (1892-1972), a school teacher, in 1918.  They had two children.

References

1888 births
1972 deaths
Politicians from Newark, New Jersey
New Jersey Republicans